John Blackstock Miller (1890 – 24 November 1932) was a Scottish footballer who played as a goalkeeper for Dumbarton. He also had a short spell with St Mirren in 1918-19 and loan spells with Renton (1914–15), Airdrieonians (16) and Rangers (1919).

References

Scottish footballers
Sportspeople from Dumbarton
Footballers from West Dunbartonshire
Dumbarton F.C. players
Scottish Football League players
Association football goalkeepers
St Mirren F.C. players
Renton F.C. players
Bo'ness F.C. players
Airdrieonians F.C. (1878) players
Rangers F.C. players
1890 births
Date of birth missing
1932 deaths